Hamblin is a surname. Notable people with the surname include:

Charles Leonard Hamblin (1922-1985), Australian philosopher, logician and professor
Henry Thomas Hamblin (1873-1958), English mystic, author, and publisher
Jacob Hamblin (1819-1886), American pioneer and missionary
Jacob Darwin Hamblin (born 1974), American historian of science, technology, and environmental issues
James Hamblin (disambiguation), multiple people
Joseph Eldridge Hamblin (1828-1870), American general during the Civil War
Ken Hamblin (1940- ), host of the Ken Hamblin Show
T. J. Hamblin (1943-2012), Professor of Immunohaematology at the University of Southampton
Thomas S. Hamblin (1800-1853), English actor and theatre manager
William J. Hamblin, professor of history at Brigham Young University

See also
Lee–Hamblin family